Jacou is a commune in the Hérault département in the Occitanie region in southern France.  Located on the outskirts of Montpellier, it is situated around 7 km (4.3 mi) north of the Montpellier city centre. In 2016, it had a population of 6,785.

Population

See also
Communes of the Hérault department

References

Communes of Hérault